NGC 7793 is a flocculent spiral galaxy in the southern constellation of Sculptor. It was discovered in 1826 by Scottish astronomer James Dunlop. NGC 7793 is one of the five brightest galaxies within the Sculptor Group.

The morphological class of NGC 7793 is SA(s)d, indicating it is unbarred spiral galaxy (SA) with no inner ring structure (s) and the arms are loosely wound and disorganized (d). It is flocculent in appearance with a very small bulge and a star cluster at the nucleus. The galactic disk is inclined at an angle of 53.7° to the line of sight from the Earth. There are two nearby dwarf galaxy companions.

On March 25, 2008, a type II-P supernova designated SN 2008bk was discovered in NGC 7793. At apparent magnitude 12.5, it became the 2nd brightest supernova of 2008. The progenitor of this supernova was a red supergiant, observed only 547 days prior to the explosion.

Jets from a black hole named P13 power a large nebula designated S26 in the outer spiral of this galaxy. Recently, the mass of P13 was determined to be less than 15 solar masses, and its companion star is estimated to be around 20 solar masses. The two orbit each other in 64 days. Based on this estimate, P13 is stripping material away from a nearby star about ten times faster than was previously believed to be physically possible. If correct, this observation would show flaws in theories that a black hole's mass and rate of consumption are a fixed relationship.

Gallery

See also

 NGC 300 - a similar spiral galaxy that is near NGC 7793
 NGC 2403 - a similar spiral galaxy

References

External links

 SST: NGC 7793


Unbarred spiral galaxies
Sculptor Group
Sculptor (constellation)
7793
73049
Astronomical objects discovered in 1826